England Knights (previously known as Emerging England and England A) is considered the feeder team for the England rugby league team. The Knights play a key role in the development of emerging talent, allowing players to gain experience in an international environment and to compete for a place in the England first team.

History

1990s–2000s: Origins
The idea of a second England team originated in the 1990s as "Emerging England" to give young players a chance to play internationally before being called up to the senior side. Throughout the late 1990s and 2000s Emerging England played against the senior sides of developing nations. In another  incarnation as "England A", the team took on the Australian Kangaroos in the second game of the 2003 Kangaroo tour of Great Britain and France. The Kangaroos defeated England A 26–22 in front of 6,817 fans.

2011–13: Foundation
In the late 2000s, the idea of a second England team was dropped until 2011 when the RFL decided to resurrect it as England Knights. A squad of players under 25 were chosen play against France and where they came out 38–18 victors. The following year they competed in and won the 2012 European Championship and defeated Samoa in a 2013 test match.

2014–17: Hiatus
The England Knights team was not utilized at all between 2014 and 2017.

2018: Return
In 2018 it was announced that the Knights would go on a two series tour of Papua New Guinea.

Current squad
Squad selected for the upcoming match against  Jamaica on 15 October 2021.

Competitive Records

Overview

References

External links
 England Knights

National rugby league second teams
Rugby league in England
England national rugby league team